The Dynasty: Roc-La-Familia is the fifth studio album by American rapper Jay-Z, featuring prominent appearances from signees of Roc-A-Fella Records.  It was released on October 31, 2000, by Roc-A-Fella Records and Def Jam Recordings. Its lead single, "I Just Wanna Love U (Give It 2 Me)", produced by the Neptunes, was one of Jay-Z's most successful singles peaking at number 11 on the Billboard Hot 100. The album debuted at number 1 on the Billboard 200 with 557,789 copies sold in its first week. The album is certified 2× Platinum by the RIAA. The album received positive reviews from music critics, and ended up becoming the 20th highest-selling R&B/hip-hop album of the 2000–2010 decade according to Billboard.

Music
Though originally billed as a Roc-A-Fella Records compilation album—showcasing Roc-A-Fella artists such as Memphis Bleek, Beanie Sigel, Amil, and Freeway—The Dynasty was marketed as Jay-Z solo album. The production was handled primarily by Just Blaze, Kanye West, Bink!, and the Neptunes.

Track listing

Notes
"Change the Game" features additional vocals by Static
"I Just Wanna Love U (Give It 2 Me)" features additional vocals by Pharrell Williams and Omillio Sparks
"Get Your Mind Right Mami"  features additional vocals by Rell
"Stick 2 the Script" features additional vocals by DJ Clue
"Parkin Lot Pimpin'" features additional vocals by Lil' Mo
"Where Have You Been" features additional vocals by L. Dionne

Sample credits
"Intro" contains a sample of "She Said She Loves Me" by Kleeer.
"I Just Wanna Love U (Give It 2 Me)" contains elements of "Give It to Me Baby" performed by Rick James, and an interpolation "The World Is Filled..." by the Notorious B.I.G.
"Squeeze 1st" contains interpolations of "Hypnotize" and "Who Shot Ya?", both performed by the Notorious B.I.G.
"1-900-Hustler" contains a sample of "Ain't Gonna Happen" by Ten Wheel Drive
"Change the Game" and "Get Your Mind Right Mami" both contain a sample of "You Gots to Chill" by EPMD.
"Soon You'll Understand" contains a sample of the Love Theme from The Landlord, by Al Kooper.
"Stick 2 the Script" contains a sample of "Under Pressure" by Nick Ingman.
"You, Me, Him, and Her" contains a sample of "What's Your Name" performed by the Moments.
"This Can't Be Life" contains a sample of "I Miss You" performed by Harold Melvin & the Blue Notes
"Where Have You Been" contains a sample of "Agua De Dos Ríos" performed by Camilo Sesto.

Personnel
Adapted from AllMusic.

 B-High – producer
 Kareem "Biggs" Burke – executive producer
 Shawn Carter – executive producer
 Damon Dash – executive producer
 L. Dionne – vocals
 DJ Clue? – featured artist, vocals
 Freeway – primary artist
 Chad Hugo – producer
 Ken "Duro" Ifill – mixing
 Jay-Z – vocals
 Kyambo "Hip Hop" Joshua – executive producer
 Just Blaze – producer, scratching
 R. Kelly – featured artist
 Lil' Mo – featured artist
 Jonathan Mannion – photography
 Memphis Bleek – featured artist
 Monica Morrow – stylist
 Rell – vocals
 Rick Rock – producer
 Scarface – featured artist
 Beanie Sigel – featured artist
 Snoop Dogg – featured artist
 Static – vocals
 Dawud West – art direction, design
 Kanye West – producer
 Pharrell Williams – producer
 Shane "Bermy" Woodley – assistant engineer
 Amil – featured artist

Charts

Weekly charts

Singles

Year-end charts

Certifications

See also
List of Billboard 200 number-one albums of 2000
List of Billboard number-one R&B albums of 2000

References

External links
 Z-The-Dynasty-Roc-La-Familia-2000-/master/46962 The Dynasty: Roc La Familia at Discogs

Jay-Z albums
2000 albums
Albums produced by Bink (record producer)
Albums produced by Just Blaze
Albums produced by Kanye West
Albums produced by the Neptunes
Albums produced by Rick Rock
Albums produced by Rockwilder
Def Jam Recordings albums
Roc-A-Fella Records albums